John Stainburn (birth unknown), also known by the nickname of "Ginger Whippet", is a former professional rugby league footballer who played in the 1980s and 1990s, and coached in the 1990s. He played at club level for Shaw Cross Sharks ARLFC, Batley, and Batley Victoria ARLFC, as a left-footed goal-kicking , i.e. number 7, and coached at club level for Batley Victoria ARLFC.

Testimonial Match
John Stainburn's Testimonial match at Batley took place in 1993.

Contemporaneous Article Extract
"John Stainburn Scrum-half. A product of the prolific Heavy Woollen Amateurs (Shaw Cross ARLFC), nuggety scrum-half Stainburn has some memorable performances at Mount Pleasant to his name, although he struggled to hold a regular first team place in 1990-91. The previous season he played 33 senior games for Batley, kicking 42 goals, six drops and scoring one try."

References

Living people
Batley Bulldogs players
English rugby league coaches
English rugby league players
Place of birth missing (living people)
Rugby league halfbacks
Year of birth missing (living people)